The term "Multiplane" can refer to:

Multiplane camera
Multiplane (aeronautics), describing aircraft having multiple lifting surfaces
Classification of multiplanes at Wing configuration#Number and position of main-planes